Racing Futsal Luxembourg is a futsal club based in Luxembourg City, Luxembourg.

The club was founded in 2016 and joined the Federation Luxembourgeoise de Football (FLF). On 5 March 2017 the club became the champion of the first official competition in Futsal Ligue 2 and was promoted to Futsal Ligue 1. In the 2017/18 debut season the club won the championship and the national cup. Racing Futsal won the national championship again this year and will participate in the second edition of the UEFA Futsal Champions League.

Honours

Domestic
Luxembourg Futsal Ligue 1 Champions (2) 
 2017–18, 2018–19
Luxembourg Futsal Cup Winners (1) 
 2016–17
Luxembourg Futsal Ligue 2 Champions (1) 
 2016–17

International
UEFA Futsal Champions League Participations (2) 
 2018–19, 2019–20

Current squad

Technical Staff

 Tiago Fernandes (Directeur Sportif)
 José Valente
 Carmen Sousa
 Steve Martins
 Ana Maria Valente
 Jorge Fernandes
 Cristiano Alves

Coaching Staff

 André Sério (Head Coach)
 Miguel Monteiro (Deputy Coach)
 Julien Mantovanelli (Deputy Coach)

Players

References

External links
 Club Official Website
 club profile at UEFA.com
 club profile at thefinalball.com

Futsal clubs in Luxembourg
Futsal clubs established in 2016
2016 establishments in Luxembourg